Alleyne_Lett (born 7 January 1983 ) is a Grenadian athlete who competed in the decathlon.

Personal bests

Competition record

References 

http://www.lsusports.net/ViewArticle.dbml?DB_OEM_ID=5200&ATCLID=174399&Q_SEASON=2006

External links
 

1983 births
Living people
Grenadian decathletes
Athletes (track and field) at the 2003 Pan American Games
Pan American Games competitors for Grenada
Grenadian male javelin throwers
Grenadian male discus throwers